Shiwatoo, located 7 km to the west of Mahabad, overlooking Mahabad-Piranshahr road in the West Azarbaijan Province, Iran, is an archaeological site of the Lower Paleolithic,  years ago. Archaeologists collected nearly one hundred artifacts from an area measuring about one hectare overlooking the Mahabad River. Many of the artifacts were made from andesite, quartzite, and basalt cobbles. The stone industry consists primarily of cores, tested cobbles, and core-choppers. The most characteristic find from this site is a Cleaver (tool), which is a type of biface stone tool of Acheulean tradition of the Lower Palaeolithic.

References 

 https://www.researchgate.net/figure/Acheulian-artifacts-from-Shiwatoo-Mahabad-region-Drawing-J-Jaubert_fig3_292068003
 https://www.academia.edu/13844333/Shiwatoo-_Lower_Paleolithic
 The Paleolithic of Iran: Report of 2004 Iranian-French Joint Mission

Lower Paleolithic
Pleistocene
Archaeological sites in Iran
Former populated places in Iran
History of Iran